Johannes van Keulen (1654 in Deventer – 1715 in Amsterdam) was a 17th-century Dutch cartographer. He published the influential nautical atlas the Zee-Atlas and the pilot guide Zee-Fakkel (meaning Sea-Torch in English).

In 1678 Johannes van Keulen established himself in Amsterdam and in 1680 he obtained a patent from the States of Holland and West Friesland allowing him to print and publish maritime atlases and shipping guides. These were books of maps and descriptions of itineraries, used by helmsmen for safe navigation. The patent was a kind of protection against illegal copying of produced books and charts. This was especially important for the atlases which were made with extensive initial costs. Van Keulen named his firm ‘In de Gekroonde Lootsman’ ('In the Crowned Pilot'). Soon Van Keulen struck a deal with cartographer Claes Jansz. Vooght.

From 1681 onwards the Nieuwe Lichtende Zee-Fakkel appeared, a five-volume atlas for which Vooght compiled the maps and which was illustrated by Jan Luyken. The five volume Zee-Fakkel made Johannes van Keulen famous. The Zee-Fakkel was published in 5 volumes between 1681 and 1684 containing over 130 new charts.

Descendants

His son, Gerard van Keulen (1678–1726), continued his work and produced new editions of the various volumes. Grandson Johannes II van Keulen (1704–1755) published a new edition of the volume with maps of Asian waters, first published in 1753. Great-grandson Gerard Hulst van Keulen (1733–1801) occupied himself with the last editions of the Zee-Fakkel.

References

1654 births
1715 deaths
People from Deventer
17th-century Dutch cartographers